Sabresuchus is an extinct genus of neosuchian crocodyliform from the Cretaceous of Europe. The name is derived from 'Sabre' in reference to the enlarged and curved fifth maxillary tooth, and 'suchus' from the Ancient Greek for crocodile.

Taxonomy
Two valid species are currently recognized: Sabresuchus ibericus from eastern Spain, and Sabresuchus symplesiodon from Romania,. Both species were previously assigned under the genus  Theriosuchus, as T. ibericus and T. symplesiodon respectively. A 2016 cladistic analysis recovered it as a neosuchian more closely related to members of the family Paralligatoridae than to atoposaurids.

References

Neosuchians
Crocodyliforms
Cretaceous Romania
Fossils of Romania
Cretaceous Spain
Fossils of Spain
La Huérguina Formation
Fossil taxa described in 2016
Prehistoric pseudosuchian genera